Chemical, biological, radiological and nuclear defence (CBRN defence) or NBC protection are protective measures taken in situations in which chemical, biological, radiological or nuclear warfare (including terrorism) hazards may be present. CBRN defence consists of CBRN passive protection, contamination avoidance, and weapons of mass destruction mitigation.

A CBRN incident differs from a hazardous material incident in both scope (i.e., CBRN can be a mass casualty situation) and intent. CBRN incidents are responded to under the assumption that they are intentional and malicious; evidence preservation and perpetrator apprehension are of greater concern than with Hazmat team incidents.

A 2011 forecast concluded that worldwide government spending on CBRN defence products and services would reach US$8.38bn that year.

Etymology
In English the term CBRN is a replacement for the 1960s–1980s term NBC (nuclear, biological, and chemical), which had replaced the term ABC (atomic, biological, and chemical) that was used in the 1950s. The addition of the R (for radiological) is a consequence of the "new" threat of a radiological weapon (also known as "dirty bombs"). In the 2000s, the term CBRNe was introduced as an extension of CBRN - the e in this term representing the enhanced (improvised) explosives threat.

In Spanish the term NRBQ (Nuclear, Radiológico, Bacteriológico y Químico) has replaced NBQ.

By country or region

Brazil

Brazilian firefighters are trained for NBC situations. During the 2016 Summer Olympics, police forces like the GATE from Minas Gerais, the Federal Police, and the National Public Security Force were prepared.

In the military, there is CBRN equipment and personnel in all branches of the Armed Forces. The Brazilian Army has two specific teams: the 1st Chemical, Biological, Radiological and Nuclear Defense Battalion, which is based at Rio de Janeiro and is responsible for decontaminating military equipment, weapons, and personnel, and the Chemical, Biological, Radiological and Nuclear Defense Company, based at Goiânia and part of the Brazilian Special Operations Command, that makes the decontamination and defense in CBRN situations. The Brazilian Presidential Guard and Army Police also have CBRN units.

The Brazilian Marine Corps has the CDefNBQR (Nuclear, Biological, Chemical and Radiological Defense Center) that controls the ARAMAR Nuclear, Biological, Chemical and Radiological Defense Battalion, at Iperó, São Paulo, conceived to provide physical security and to perform CBRN emergencies control actions at the Centro Experimental Aramar, responsible for developing Brazilian Navy nuclear researches; the Itaguaí Nuclear, Biological, Chemical and Radiological Defense Battalion, at Itaguaí, Rio de Janeiro, which is to be the host of the first Brazilian Navy nuclear-powered submarine; and the Nuclear, Biological, Chemical and Radiological Defense Company, at Duque de Caxias, Rio de Janeiro. The Air Force is making special teams for transporting victims from CBRN attacks/accidents.

Canada

The term CBRN is in common use in disaster and emergency services organizations across the country. Since July 2005, the Canadian Armed Forces also started using the term CBRN Defence, instead of NBC Defence, due to the increased threat of dirty bomb use (which is radiological in nature). CBRNE is a new term that is being used in both civilian and military organizations. The Canadian Joint Incident Response Unit is a Canadian Forces unit, under the direction of the Canadian Special Operations Forces Command, charged with supporting "the Government of Canada in order to prevent, control and mitigate CBRN threats to Canada, Canadians and Canadian interests."

All members of the Canadian Armed Forces are trained in CBRNE defense, and maintain minimum standards, tested at least every three years.

At the provincial level, cities are provided opportunities for their emergency services with CBRN training. In Ontario, emergency services in Windsor, Peterborough, Toronto, and Ottawa have obtained CBRN standing at NFPA Standard 472 Awareness Level 3.

European Union 
In mid-July 2016, the European Parliament negotiated a new draft counterterrorism directive aimed at protecting Europe's people from biological, chemical and other attacks. The timeline of the directive is illustrated in the following table:

The directive would criminalize:
 Certain acts related to preparing for a terrorist attack, such as traveling abroad to meet with a terrorist group
 Training to make explosives, firearms, and other dangerous substances
 Public incitement or praise for terrorism and financing of terrorism
The directive also includes text to help victims of terror attacks.

Hong Kong
Hong Kong has had CBRN response capabilities since the early 1990s and advanced training from 1998. The Standing CBRN Planning Group (known as the SRPG) plans for all CBRN incidents in Hong Kong. The SRPG was set up with the support of the Secretary for Security by the Senior Bomb Disposal Officer in Hong Kong, Dominic Brittain. It consists of representatives from 9 government departments who plan the response to CBRN threats. These departments include Police EOD, Fire Services, the Hospital Authority and the Department of Health, amongst others. The operational arm of the SRPG is the CBRN Incident Advisory Group (RIAG) who form up in the initial stages of a CBRN incident using telephone conferencing. RIAG consists of five experts who assist with the technical response to the incident by providing real time advice and support to the departments involved. The Hong Kong capability is well rehearsed, with regular departmental exercises conducted and a full scale CBRN exercise conducted every year.

India
The Indian Army ordered 16 CBRN monitoring vehicles, of which the first 8 were inducted in December 2010. It was developed by the Defence Research and Development Organization (DRDO) and manufactured by Ordnance Factories Board.

Indonesia

Army
The Indonesian Army has a CBRN defense unit which is the Kompi Zeni Nuklir, Biologi dan Kimia (abbreviated "Kompi Zeni Nubika Pusat Zeni TNI AD") translated as: Army Engineers Nuclear, Biological, and Chemical company. The unit was founded on 22 April 1986 under the command of the Indonesian Army Corps of Engineers. The unit is also under cooperation with the Ministry of Health, Indonesian Nuclear power regulator agency, Veterinary Research Agency, and National Nuclear Power agency. This unit is the one and only unit that can handle CBRN Defense Capability within the Armed Forces.

Police
The Indonesian National Police special unit  the Mobile Brigade Corps (Brimob) has a CBR unit under the Gegana detachment. It was formed in December 2009. This unit acts as first responders to bomb and terrorist threats in the public.

Republic of Ireland

The Irish Defence Forces have CBRNE training and equipment capabilities – in particular the Ordnance Corps (Explosive Ordnance Disposal/EOD teams), Engineer Corps and Army Ranger Wing (ARW) – and will aid the civil authority if requested. The Irish Army runs CBRNE defence courses, and has detection equipment, decontamination equipment and is reported to have purchased 10,000 protective CBRN/NBC suits, enough for all of its personnel. All Army Reserve personnel undergo CBRN warfare defence training.

The Irish national police force, the Garda Síochána, has a number of nationwide CBRN response teams. The teams are based regionally (in six regions; Dublin, Eastern, Northern, Southern, South-Eastern & Western) and began operating from 2004 with 100 trained officers (170 responders trained throughout the country as of 2009). There is a requirement for members to be re-certified within 18 months of training. CBRN response teams are trained by the Garda Tactical Training Unit, and supported nationally by the Emergency Response Unit (ERU). Other emergency services also have limited CBRN expertise, such as the Health Service Executive (HSE) and Dublin Fire Brigade (DFB), who have a Hazardous Materials (Haz-Mat) and Chemical Incident Unit.

Sri Lanka
14 CBRN Regiment (Chemical Biological Radiology and Nuclear Regiment), Sri Lanka Engineers is a regiment of the Sri Lanka Army that focuses on countering chemical, biological, radiological and nuclear (CBRN) hazards in the country.[1][2] The Sri Lanka Navy and Sri Lanka Air Force also maintain CBRN units in addition to the Army's CBRN regiment

Malaysia
The Malaysian Army formed a CBRN unit, Peperangan Nuklear, Biologi dan Kimia 3 Divisyen (PNBK 3D) in April 2002.

The Royal Malaysia Police has CBRN providers. The Pasukan Gerakan Khas (PGK) has two special operations detachments with HAZMAT expertise - 69 Commandos and Special Actions Unit. The Federal Reserve Unit (FRU) also has a CBRN unit. Both PGK and FRU teams handle CBRN calls, before an army PNBK unit responds.

New Zealand
All members of the NZDF are trained in CBRN drills for a deployment.

RNZN
RNZN personnel conduct training with the NZ Army and RNZAF for any deployment or training.

RNZAF
The RNZAF conducted regular yearly training for all its personnel given the higher probability of airfields being the target of an enemy CBRN attack. RNZAF Security Forces personnel conduct all CBRN training for the RNZAF and complete CBRN courses at the Defence CBRN Centre in the United Kingdom.

NZ Army
The NZ Army teaches all pre-deployment CBRN training for members of the NZDF.

The New Zealand Special Air Service is also trained for operations including disposal, and containment of chemical agents in a CBRN environment.

Pakistan 
Pakistan based defence industry GIDS manufactures NBC suites which includes Individual Protective equipment (IPE) like gloves, boots, air filters as well as decontamination kits and Chemical Weapon Agent (CWA) detectors.

Spain
The Spanish Army 1st CBRN Regiment 'Valencia' was formed in March 2005. Training in the defence against CBRN agents as part of combat support is the main aim of exercise 'Grifo' (Griffin) – the most important of this type that the Army undertakes. The National Police and the Spanish Civil Guard have their own CBRN units. The Military Emergencies Unit and emergency services have CBRN training.

Sweden 
The Swedish Armed Forces has the National CBRN Defence Centre (designated SkyddC) localized in Umeå as its main CBRN protection forces. It consists of one company (1st CBRN-company) as the standing force, however SkyddC is also responsible for training conscripts, training 60 in 2022-2023.

Turkey 

CBRN defense units in Turkey are the mainly CBRN Defense Battalion (Kimyasal Biyolojik Radyolojik Nükleer (KBRN) Savunma Tabur) of Turkish Armed Forces including CBRN Defense Special Response Unit (KBRN Savunma Özel Müdahale Birliği) and CBRN School and Training Center Command (KBRN Okul ve Eğitim Merkezi) Gendarmerie General Command has also unit with in self Gendarmerie Search and Rescue Battalion Command has CBRN units. Ministry of the Interior's associated Disaster and Emergency Management Presidency AFAD  Working in coordination with law enforcement units to intervene in the events of any CBRN accident. Apart from these, Turkey mostly makes its own CBRN protective clothing and equipment. Mechanical and Chemical Industry Corporation's Maksam factory mainly covers the needs of respirators for the NATO and neighboring countries. Main products such as SR6 and SR6M NBC Respirator licensed United Kingdom production. MAKSAM Panoramic Mask MKE NEFES (breath) CBRN Gas Mask SR10 and SR10 ST Masks

United Kingdom

CBRN is also used by the UK Home Office as a civil designation.  Police, fire and ambulance services in the UK must all have some level of CBRN providers.  Within the ambulance service this is performed by the Hazardous Area Response Team (HART) and Special Operations Response Team (SORT). Since the introduction of new equipment to UK fire services under the New Dimension programme, CBRN decontamination of personnel (including members of the public) has become a task carried out by fire services in the UK and they regularly train for such scenarios. 

Army

All personnel are trained in CBRN through basic training and are to complete an online assessment annually. 

The British Army has a single dedicated regiment to all C-CBRN (Counter) matters in the armed forces. 28 Engineer Regiment is the only regiment within the armed forces that has full C-CBRN capability. Formed in 2019 the regiment will officially be at full operational capability from early 2023, with the need for CBRN specialists becoming of more importance.

Personnel within the regiment are trained in live environments where CBRN materials are used.

United States

The United States Army uses CBRN as an abbreviation for their Chemical, Biological, Radiological, and Nuclear Operations Specialists (MOS).  The United States Army trains all US Army soldiers pursuing a career in CBRN at the United States Army CBRN School (USACBRNS) at Fort Leonard Wood.

The USAF uses Air Force Specialty Code (AFSC 3E9X1) U.S. Air Force Emergency Management, who are also CBRN Specialists. The USAF trains all US Airmen pursuing a career in counter-CBRN operations at the USAF CBRN School at Fort Leonard Wood. The USMC uses CBRN as an abbreviation for two military occupational specialties. The Marine Corps runs a CBRN School to train Marine CBRN Defense Officers and Marine CBRN Defense Specialists at Fort Leonard Wood, Missouri.
See also: Chemical Biological Incident Response Force (USMC CBIRF)

The USN requires all personnel to take a web-based CBRNE training annually to get a basic understanding of facts and procedures related to responding to a CBRNE incident.

The Russian Federation

The Nuclear, Biological and Chemical Protection Troops (NBC Protection Troops) of the Russian Federation are special forces designed to conduct the most complex set of measures aimed at reducing the loss of associations and formations of the Ground Forces and ensuring their combat tasks assigned during operations in conditions of radioactive, chemical and biological contamination, as well as at enhancing their survivability and protection against high-precision and other weapons.

The Russian government vaccinated around half a million reindeer against anthrax in 2015. Around 1.5 million reindeer carcasses in Russian permafrost are at risk of melting due to global warming in the Arctic. There is a risk that global warming in the Arctic can thaw the permafrost, leading to new infections in reindeer. An anthrax outbreak in 2016 in reindeer caused the Russian Armed Forces to evacuate a nomadic reindeer herding tribe.

In May 2012, BioPrepWatch reported that the Russian security service ordered over 100 "capsule cradles", which are devices that people can use to protect infants or even small pets in the event of a nuclear, chemical, biological, or radiological threat. According to the article, Soviet military engineers invented the capsules in the 1960s. A company is currently producing the capsules in a factory in Russia.

CBRN products

Numbers vary, but news reports and market forecast reports place the market for CRBN products in 2013 and 2014 between US$8.7–8.8 billion. The market for CBRN products is expected to grow to over US$13 billion by 2023. Notable CBRN manufacturers include Bruker, Proengin, FLIR Systems, SEC Technologies and Research International
 Bruker produces ion-mobility spectrometry for military and security personnel that separates, identifies and analyzes ionized molecules present in gas.
 PROENGIN offers CBRN Threat Management solutions. PROENGIN is in Flame Spectrophotometry technology (FPD), which provide detection capability against chemical & biological threats for military and first responders.
 FLIR Systems produces handheld detection equipment devices for chemical, radiation, biological and explosives detection.
 Research International creates a sensor system, for subways and other public areas that uses multi-sensor surveillance technology that detects the presence of CBRN particles.
 Slovak company SEC Technologies develops and produces an active stand-off detector that can detect chemicals in low concentrations from long distances (6 kilometers).

See also

Biological and Chemical Defence Review Committee (Canada)
Biosecurity
Bioterrorism
Poison gas in World War I
Hazmat suit
HazMat team
List of CBRN warfare forces
Overpressure (CBRN protection)
NBC suit

References

Bibliography

  Includes bibliographical essay. Review

External links

Emergency management
Radioactive contamination